"Disco Inferno" is a song by American disco band the Trammps from their 1976 fourth studio album of the same name. With two other cuts by the group, it reached No. 1 on the US Billboard Dance Club Songs chart in early 1977, but had limited mainstream success until 1978, after being included on the soundtrack to the 1977 film Saturday Night Fever, when a re-release hit number eleven on the Billboard Hot 100 chart.

It was also notably covered in 1993 by American-born singer Tina Turner on What's Love Got to Do with It, and in 1998 by American singer-songwriter Cyndi Lauper on the A Night at the Roxbury soundtrack. Among others who covered this are Damien Lovelock, Hardsonic Bottoms 3, and Vicki Shepard.

Song information
The song was originally recorded by the Trammps in 1976 and released as a single. It was supposedly inspired by a scene in the 1974 blockbuster film The Towering Inferno. According to Tom Moulton, who mixed the record, the Dolby noise reduction had been set incorrectly during the mixdown of the tracks.  When engineer Jay Mark discovered the error and corrected it, the mix had a much wider dynamic range than was common at the time. Due to this, the record seems to "jump out" at the listener. With "Starvin'" and "Body Contact Contract", it topped the U.S. Disco chart for six weeks in the late winter of 1977.  On the other U.S. charts, "Disco Inferno"  hit number nine on the Black Singles chart, but it was not initially a significant success at pop radio, peaking at number 53 on the Billboard Hot 100.

However, some radio stations, especially the AM, banned the song from the airwaves due to the repeated line "burn baby burn", which reminded people of the Watts riots in 1965.

"Disco Inferno" gained much greater recognition when the nearly 11 minute album version was included on the soundtrack to the 1977 film Saturday Night Fever. Re-released by Atlantic Records, the track peaked at number 11 in the U.S. during the spring of 1978, becoming the Trammps' biggest and most-recognized single. Later, it was included in the Saturday Night Fever musical, interpreted by 'DJ Monty' in the "Odissey 2001" discothèque.  A cover version of the track was issued by the group Players Association in March 1978 on the Vanguard record label both in 7" and 12" format.  It was produced by Danny Weiss and also issued as a track on their 1979 LP Born to Dance.

In 2004, a 12" version with the 10:54-minute version and "Can We Come Together" (from the album Where the Happy People Go) on the B side was released in the UK. This version was certified Silver in 2021 by the British Phonographic Industry.

On September 19, 2005, "Disco Inferno" was inducted into the Dance Music Hall of Fame.

Personnel
The Trammps
Jimmy Ellis – lead vocal
Robert Upchurch – lead and baritone vocal
Earl Young – bass vocal
Harold Wade – first tenor
Stanley Wade – second tenor

Additional Personnel
Ronald Baker – bass guitar
Earl Young – drums
Norman Harris, Bobby Eli, T.J. Tindall – guitars
T.G. Conway – keyboards
Don Renaldo and His Strings and Horns

Charts

Weekly charts

{| class="wikitable sortable"
!Chart (1978)
!Peakposition
|-
|Australia (KMR)
| style="text-align:center;"|32
|-
|Canada Top Singles (RPM)
| style="text-align:center;"|6
|-
|New Zealand (Recorded Music NZ)
| style="text-align:center;"|13
|-
|UK Singles (OCC)
| style="text-align:center;"|16
|-
|US Billboard Hot 100
| style="text-align:center;"|11
|-
|US Cash Box Top 100
| style="text-align:center;"|8
|}

Year-end charts

Certifications

Tina Turner version

American singer and actress Tina Turner covered the song for the What's Love Got to Do with It soundtrack. Released as a single in August 1993, it charted at number 12 on the UK Singles Chart, and reached the top 20 also in Belgium, Iceland, Ireland, and the Netherlands. The single included remixes by the Beatmasters.

Critical reception
In an retrospective review of What's Love Got to Do with It, the Daily Vault felt "Disco Inferno" "has a dated title to begin with and the arrangement's enthusiasm doesn't live up to Turner's singing". Upon the release, Alan Jones from Music Week gave the song four out of five, writing, "From the woman whose interpretations are often a million miles away from the original, this is a disappointingly standard interpretation of the old Trammps hit. Having said that, it is a highly commercial song and Tina's one-of-a-kind voice has many admirers, so another big hit is in prospect." A reviewer from People Magazine noted its "dance dramaturgy" and the "characteristic flair and energy that have made Tina the envy of every singer this side of Aretha." Sam Wood from Philadelphia Inquirer found that the "joyous, over-the-top treatment" of the disco classic "reeks of campy white polyester suits and oily sweat under a dance-floor glitter ball." Toby Anstis reviewed the song for Smash Hits, giving it four out of five. He said, "Tina pulls off this cover really well. It's nice hearing a rauchy female rock voice like that. I think I prefer this version to the original. I'd boogie to that any time at a party. I think I'd go and see the film about her soon too. Yeah, she's great."

Track listings

 UK 7-inch and cassette; Australian cassette single
 "Disco Inferno" (album version) – 4:03
 "I Don't Wanna Fight" (single edit) – 4:25

 UK, European, and Australian CD single
 "Disco Inferno" (album version) – 4:03
 "I Don't Wanna Fight" (single edit) – 4:25
 "Disco Inferno" (12-inch version) – 5:33
 "Disco Inferno" (12-inch dub) – 6:57

 UK 12-inch single
 "Disco Inferno" (12-inch version) – 5:33
 "Disco Inferno" (12-inch dub) – 6:57
 "Disco Inferno" (album version) – 4:03

 Australian CD single
 "Disco Inferno" (album version) – 4:03
 "Tina's Wish" – 3:08
 "The Best" (single edit) – 4:08
 "Proud Mary" – 5:25

Charts

Weekly charts

Year-end charts

Cyndi Lauper version

American singer and songwriter Cyndi Lauper performed this song live for the first time at New York, Bryant Park on June 21, 1998.

In the Billboard magazine dated May 16, 1998, in the "Dance Trax" column, there was a story on remixers Bobby Guy and Ernie Lake, aka Soul Solution: "They are working with Cyn on a chest-pounding rendition of 'Disco Inferno'. The cut will be featured on the forthcoming soundtrack to A Night At Roxbury''."

Although the original release date of the maxi single was August 3, 1999, it was distributed from July 24 in some regions. The single was officially released in the U.S. in August 1999. Lauper performed it at many shows, including her Summer Tour '99, around the time of its release.

Official versions

Boris & Beck Roxy Edit Dub
Boris & Beck Roxy Dub
Club Mix
Rescue Me Mix
Soul Solution A Capella
Soul Solution Drumapella
Soul Solution Mix
Soul Solution Radio Edit

Accolades

|-
||1999
|"Disco Inferno"
|Grammy Award for Best Dance Recording
|

Charts

References

External links
 Soultrain.com

Songs about disco
Disco songs
1976 singles
1977 singles
1993 singles
1999 singles
The Trammps songs
Tina Turner songs
Cyndi Lauper songs
Songs from Saturday Night Fever
Songs written by Ron Kersey
1976 songs
Atlantic Records singles
Parlophone singles